They is the second studio album by  King Missile (Dog Fly Religion), released in 1988 by Shimmy Disc.

Reception

Tim DiGravina of AllMusic called They "remarkably accomplished" and "filled with potent, dark humor, but its gentle spirit and artistic puns make for a compelling listen." Trouser Press said "Hall's black humor meshes nicely with Dogbowl's more romantic inclinations."

Track listing

Personnel
Adapted from the They liner notes.

King Missile
 Charles Curtis – cello
 Steve Dansiger – drums, percussion
 John S. Hall – lead vocals
 Stephen Tunney (as Dogbowl) – guitar, backing vocals

Additional performers
 Alex DeLaszlo – saxophone ("Double Fucked by 2 Black Studs")
 R.B. Korbet – drums ("Double Fucked by 2 Black Studs")
 Mark Kramer – slide guitar, production, engineering
 David Licht – additional percussion

Production and design
 Macioce – cover art, photography

Release history

References

External links 
 
 
 They at iTunes

King Missile albums
1988 albums
Shimmy Disc albums
Albums produced by Kramer (musician)